ISO 25178: Geometrical Product Specifications (GPS) – Surface texture: areal is an International Organization for Standardization collection of international standards relating to the analysis of 3D areal surface texture.

Structure of the standard 
Documents constituting the standard :

 Part 1: Indication of surface texture
 Part 2: Terms, definitions and surface texture parameters
 Part 3: Specification operators
 Part 6: Classification of methods for measuring surface texture
 Part 70: Material measures
 Part 71: Software measurement standards
 Part 72: XML file format x3p
 Part 600: Metrological characteristics for areal-topography measuring methods 
 Part 601: Nominal characteristics of contact (stylus) instruments
 Part 602: Nominal characteristics of non-contact (confocal chromatic probe) instruments
 Part 603: Nominal characteristics of non-contact (phase-shifting interferometric microscopy) instruments
 Part 604: Nominal characteristics of non-contact (coherence scanning interferometry) instruments
 Part 605: Nominal characteristics of non-contact (point autofocus probe) instruments
 Part 606: Nominal characteristics of non-contact (focus variation) instruments
 Part 607: Nominal characteristics of non-contact (confocal microscopy) instruments 
 Part 700: Calibration of surface texture measuring instruments [NWIP]
 Part 701: Calibration and measurement standards for contact (stylus) instruments

Other documents might be proposed in the future but the structure is now almost defined. Part 600 will replace the common part found in all other parts. When revised, parts 60x will be reduced to only contain descriptions specific to the instrument technology.

New features
It is the first international standard taking into account the specification and measurement of 3D surface texture.  In particular, the standard defines 3D surface texture parameters and the associated specification operators.  It also describes the applicable measurement technologies, calibration methods, together with the physical calibration standards and calibration software that are required.

A major new feature incorporated into the standard is coverage of  non-contact measurement methods, already commonly used by industry, but up until now lacking a standard to support quality audits within the framework of ISO 9000.  For the first time, the standard brings 3D surface metrology methods into the official domain, following 2D profilometric methods that have been subject to standards for over 30 years. The same thing applies to measurement technologies that are not restricted to contact measurement (with a diamond point stylus), but can also be optical, such as chromatic confocal gauges and interferometric microscopes.

New definitions 
The ISO 25178 standard is considered by TC213 as first and foremost providing a redefinition of the foundations of surface texture, based upon the principle that nature is intrinsically 3D. It is anticipated that future work will extend these new concepts into the domain of 2D profilometric surface texture analysis, requiring a total revision of all current surface texture standards (ISO 4287, ISO 4288, ISO 1302, ISO 11562, ISO 12085, ISO 13565, etc.)

A new vocabulary is imposed:
 S filter: filter eliminating the smallest scale elements from the surface (or of the shortest wavelength for a linear filter)
 L filter: filter eliminating the largest scale elements from the surface (or of the longest wavelength for a linear filter)
 F operator: operator suppressing nominal form.
 Primary surface: surface obtained after S filtering.
 S-F surface: surface obtained after applying an F operator to the primary surface.
 S-L surface: surface obtained after applying an L filter to the S-F surface.
 Nesting index: index corresponding to the cut-off wavelength of a linear filter, or to the scale of the structuring element of a morphological filter.   Under 25178, industry-specific taxonomies such as roughness vs waviness are replaced by the more general concept of "scale limited surface" and "cut-off" by "nesting index".

The new available filters are described in the series of technical specifications included in ISO 16610. These filters include: the Gaussian filter, the spline filter, robust filters, morphological filters, wavelet filters, cascading filters, etc.

Parameters

Generalities

3D areal surface texture parameters are written with the capital letter S (or V) followed by a suffix of one or two small letters.  They are calculated on the entire surface and no more by averaging estimations calculated on a number of base lengths, as is the case for 2D parameters.  In contrast with 2D naming conventions, the name of a 3D parameter does not reflect the filtering context.  For example, Sa always appears regardless of the surface, whereas in 2D there is Pa, Ra or Wa depending on whether the profile is a primary, roughness or waviness profile.

Height parameters

These parameters involve only the statistical distribution of height values along the z axis.

Spatial parameters

These parameters involve the spatial periodicity of the data, specifically its direction.

Hybrid parameters

These parameters relate to the spatial shape of the data.

Functions and related parameters

These parameters are calculated from the material ratio curve (Abbott-Firestone curve).

Parameters related to segmentation

These feature parameters are derived from a segmentation of the surface into motifs (dales and hills). Segmentation is carried out using a watershed method.

Software 

A consortium of several companies started to work in 2008 on a free implementation of 3D surface texture parameters. The consortium, called OpenGPS
 later focused its efforts on an XML file format (X3P) that was published under the ISO standard ISO 25178-72.
Several commercial packages provide part or all of the parameters defined in ISO 25178, such as MountainsMap from Digital Surf, SPIP from Image Metrology, TrueMap 6 from TrueGage, as well as the open source Gwyddion.

Instruments 

Part 6 of the standard divides the usable technologies for 3D surface texture measurement into three families:

 Topographical instruments: contact and non-contact 3D profilometers, interferometric and confocal microscopes, structured light projectors, stereoscopic microscopes, etc.
 Profilometric instruments: contact and non-contact 2D profilometers, line triangulation lasers, etc.
 Instruments functioning by integration: pneumatic measurement, capacitive, by optical diffusion, etc.

and defines each of these technologies.

Next, the standard explores a number of these technologies in detail and dedicates two documents to each of them:

 Part 6xx: nominal characteristics of the instrument
 Part 7xx: calibration of the instrument

Contact profilometer
Parts 601 and 701 describe the contact profilometer, using a diamond point to measure the surface with the assistance of a lateral scanning device.

Chromatic confocal gauge

Part 602 describes this type of non-contact profilometer, incorporating a single point white light chromatic confocal sensor.  The operating principle is based upon the chromatic dispersion of the white light source along the optical axis, via a confocal device, and the detection of the wavelength that is focused on the surface by a spectrometer.

Coherence scanning interferometry

Part 604 describes a class of optical surface measurement methods wherein the localization of interference fringes during a scan of optical path length provides a means to determine surface characteristics such as topography, transparent film structure, and optical properties. The technique encompasses instruments that use spectrally broadband, visible sources (white light) to achieve interference fringe localization). CSI uses either fringe localization alone or in combination with interference fringe phase.

Focus variation

Part 606 describes this type of non-contact areal based method. The operating principle is based on a microscope optics with limited depth of field and a CCD camera. By scanning in vertical direction several images with different focus are gathered. This data is then used to calculate a surface data set for roughness measurement.

See also
 Surface roughness
 Waviness
 Surface metrology
 MountainsMap: surface texture analysis software
 ISO 16610: filters for surface texture

References 
 ISO 25178 on the ISO Web site
 New 3D parameters and filtration techniques for surface metrology, François Blateyron, Quality Magazine White Paper
 ISO/TS 16610-1 : Geometrical Product Specifications (GPS): Filtration – Part 1: Overview and basic concepts
 ISO/TS 14406 : Geometrical Product Specifications (GPS): Extraction
 Blateyron, F. (2013). The Areal Field Parameters. Characterisation of Areal Surface Texture. R. Leach, Springer Berlin Heidelberg: 15-43.
 de Groot, P. J. (2014). Progress in the specification of optical instruments for the measurement of surface form and texture. Proc. SPIE. 9110: 91100M-91101-91112.
 Leach, R. K., Ed. (2013). Characterisation of Areal Surface Texture. Heidelberg, Springer

25178
Metrology